Felipe Martinez Carbonell (October 21, 1990 - in Rosario, Santa Fe) is an Argentine film director, film producer, screenwriter and film editor best known for his work in the horror film genre.

Early life 
Martinez Carbonell was born in Rosario, Argentina. He graduated from the Provincial School of Film and TV from Rosario, Argentina (EPCTV) in 2012. He earned a Graduate Certificate in film producing from the University of California, Los Angeles (UCLA) in 2016. In addition to directing commercials and institutional videos, Martinez Carbonell also worked as a director/producer for Acento Advertising.

Films 
Martinez Carbonell has worked as a producer, executive producer, director, or in an otherwise creative capacity on several films where he was not credited.

Director, producer, writer & editor

Short film

Awards 

 Buenos Aires Rojo Sangre Film Festival (2021)
 Won, Best Editor and Best Script for Retrato Imaginario.
 Festival Latinoamericano de Video Rosario (2014)
 Won, Best Film for Momento.

External links 

 
 Official website

References 

1990 births
Argentine film directors
Argentine film editors
Argentine male writers
Male screenwriters
Argentine film producers
Living people